Jordan Tresson (born 30 April 1988 in Villers-la-Montagne) is a French racing driver, who previously raced in the FIA World Endurance Championship.

Career
In April 2010 Tresson won the Gran Turismo Academy, a competition run by Nissan and Sony Computer Entertainment that gives gamers the chance to become real racing drivers. Tresson immediately began racing in that year's GT4 European Cup in a Nissan 370Z run by RJN Motorsport. He finished the season tied for fourth place in the drivers' standings with 2009 GT Academy winner and RJN teammate Lucas Ordoñez, even though the pair never actually shared a car all season. In 2011 Tresson competed in the Blancpain Endurance Series in the GT4 class, again in an RJN Nissan 370Z and sharing with British drivers Alex Buncombe and Christopher Ward. The trio scored two class wins from five races to win the title.

2012 saw Tresson step up to prototype racing, taking part in the FIA World Endurance Championship in a Signatech-Nissan LMP2 car. Consistently average performances by the team saw his two co drivers released and himself shelved for the majority of 2013, till he too was released by Nissan. When asked about this in an interview he said he had 'heard the news via a press release. A process devoid of etiquette'. Jordan would go on to state that he is ready to draw a line under his motorsport career.

24 Hours of Le Mans results

Complete FIA World Endurance Championship results

References

External links
 

1988 births
Living people
Sportspeople from Meurthe-et-Moselle
French racing drivers
24 Hours of Le Mans drivers
FIA World Endurance Championship drivers
Blancpain Endurance Series drivers
GT Academy participants
Signature Team drivers
Emil Frey Racing drivers
Nürburgring 24 Hours drivers
GT4 European Series drivers